The National Book Foundation (NBF) is an American nonprofit organization established, "to raise the cultural appreciation of great writing in America". Established in 1989 by National Book Awards, Inc.,
the foundation is the administrator and sponsor of the National Book Awards, a changing set of literary awards inaugurated 1936 and continuous from 1950. It also organizes and sponsors public and educational programs.

The National Book Foundation's Board of Directors comprises representatives of American literary institutions and the book industry. For example, in 2009 the Board included the President of the New York Public Library, the Chief Merchandising Officer of Barnes & Noble, the President/Publisher of Grove/Atlantic, Inc., and others. In 2021, Ruth Dickey succeeded Lisa Lucas as the Foundation's fourth Executive Director.

The National Book Foundation's stated mission is "to celebrate the best literature in America, expand its audience, and to ensure that books have a prominent place in American culture."

Awards

National Book Awards 
The National Book Awards, established in 1950, are a set of annual literary prizes given to honor the best literature in America. Although other categories have been recognized in the past, the Awards currently recognize the best Fiction, Nonfiction, Poetry, Translated Literature, and Young People's Literature published each year.

The honored titles in each category are decided by an independent panel of writers, librarians, booksellers, and critics. These panels of five judges in each category select a Longlist of ten titles per category, which is then narrowed down to five Finalists. Winners are announced at the National Book Awards Ceremony and Benefit Dinner in November.

Lifetime Achievement 
In addition to the five National Book Awards presented each year, the Foundation presents two lifetime achievement awards: the Medal for Distinguished Contribution to American Letters and the Literarian Award for Outstanding Service to the American Literary Community.

5 Under 35 
The 5 Under 35 program was started in 2005 in order to honor five debut fiction writers, all under the age of thirty-five. The honorees are all chosen by previous National Book Awards–honored writers or 5 Under 35 honorees. Each award comes with a cash prize of $1,000. The 5 Under 35 Ceremony has been hosted by Questlove, Carrie Brownstein, LeVar Burton and others.

Innovations in Reading Prize 
Each year, the National Book Foundation's Innovations in Reading Prize awards $10,000 to an individual or organization that has developed an innovative project which creates and sustains a lifelong love of reading in the community they serve. In addition, the Foundation recognizes four projects to receive the designation of honorable mention.

Other programs

Education and access

BookUp
Book Up, the National Book Foundation's flagship educational program, believes reading for pleasure has a direct and substantial impact on young people's success in school and careers. During after-school and summer programs, BookUp connects middle- and high-school students with local authors and runs free reading groups designed to improve participants' social, emotional, and literacy skills. Young people also interact directly with the local literary community through author visits and field trips to libraries, museums, and bookstores.

Since its start in 2007, BookUp has given away over 35,000 free books, and each year helps 500 students build their first home libraries. In addition to books that groups select and read together in a book club–style format, students are given a budget to purchase books of their choosing during shopping trips to local bookstores. The program currently serves students at over 20 different sites in New York City, Detroit, Los Angeles, and Huntsville, TX.

Book Rich Environments 
Book Rich Environments is a tri-sector collaboration between nonprofit organizations, national government agencies, and corporate publishers that aims to infuse public housing communities across the country with a vibrant and accessible culture of books. The initiative connects families living in public housing communities with reading-related resources, working to improve opportunities and outcomes for public housing residents.

National Book Foundation serves as the project lead, with U.S. Department of Housing and Urban Development, U.S. Department of Education, the Urban Libraries Council, and the National Center for Families Learning serving as key planning partners. 37 HUD-assisted communities across the country serve as local partners, implementing the following three key initiative components:

 Book Distribution – free, high quality, diverse books provided to children and families living in HUD-assisted housing.
 Library Engagement – young people and families engaged in the love of reading and connected with the ongoing literacy activities offered by the local public library.
 Partnership Building – strategic partnerships on the local level, established between the local public housing authority, the local library, and local literacy partners to develop and deliver ongoing community and educational programming.

The program is made possible through the generous book donations provided by major U.S. publishers.

Raising Readers 
National Book Foundation partners with the NYC Department of Youth & Community Development (DYCD) to run the Raising Readers initiative. This innovative program aims to empower adults who work with and raise children to expand their own love of books and reading, in order to better model the habit of reading for pleasure with the young people in their lives. Raising Readers provides paid professional development training for DYCD provider staff who work with young people through after-school and summer programs, and pairs staff with NBF teaching artists to collaboratively run reading circle series for parents at local DYCD sites across the city, complete with book giveaways, high-profile author talks, and book shopping opportunities for participants.

Teen Press Conference 
The Teen Press Conference invites middle and high school students in New York City to interview the five Young People's Literature Finalists the day before the National Book Awards. Students are provided copies of the Finalists' books and are able to attend a book signing after the program.

Public programs

NBF Presents 
NBF Presents programs bring National Book Awards–honored authors and nationally recognized moderators to libraries, colleges, book festivals, and performance venues for public readings, discussions, and presentations. NBF Presents is designed to give audiences—whether in urban, suburban, or rural communities—access to some of our country's most renowned writers and their books and to create spaces where authors and audiences can connect, be in dialogue, and share ideas.

NBF Presents, under which the Foundation's public programs became grouped in 2018, was partially modeled after the long-running National Book Awards on Campus program, which began in 2005. National Book Awards on Campus brought National Book Award winners and finalists to college campuses at Sam Houston State University, Concordia College, Amherst College, and Rollins College. These academic institutions continue to host NBF Presents events each year.

Literature for Justice 
Literature for Justice (LFJ) is a nationwide, book-based campaign that seeks to contextualize and humanize the experiences of incarcerated people in the United States.

The program is guided by the Literature for Justice committee, an assemblage of well-known authors who are also experts, leaders, and advocates within the space of mass incarceration. This committee is tasked with the creation and selection of a reading list of five books annually to guide readers through this complex issue, with the hope that these texts will help shift public perception and understand of mass incarceration through the power of storytelling. Collectively, the selected books tell a story about America's carceral system and what it means for all Americans.

In addition to publicizing and promoting the LFJ reading list, the National Book Foundation presents several large-scale public events featuring authors and experts on mass incarceration, accompanied by digital assets like supplemental reading recommendations and further commentary from the LFJ committee.

The 2018–19 LFJ committee members are Sergio De La Pava, James Forman Jr., Mitchell S. Jackson, Rachel Kushner, and Heather Ann Thompson. The 2018–19 selected titles are:

 A Place to Stand, by Jimmy Santiago Baca (Grove Press, June 2002)
 Shahid Reads His Own Palm, by Reginald Dwayne Betts (Alice James Books, June 2010)
 Upstate: A Novel, by Kalisha Buckhanon (St. Martin's Press, January 2006)
 Understanding Mass Incarceration: A People's Guide to the Key Civil Rights Struggle of Our Time, by James Kilgore (The New Press, September 2015)
 Inside This Place, Not of It: Narratives From Women's Prisons, edited by Ayelet Waldman and Robin Levi (Verso Books, July 2017)

Author in Focus 
The National Book Foundation's Author in Focus program seeks to highlight and reframe the work of selected, historical authors from the National Book Awards family whose work is deserving of a renewed celebration and revival. Author in Focus consists of a year of nationwide educational and public programming celebrating these important writers and contextualizing their work for today's reader.

The 2018–19 selected author is James Baldwin, a four-time National Book Award Finalist.

Why Reading Matters Conference 
Why Reading Matters is designed to bring together educators, non-profit administrators, librarians, academics, publishing professionals, writers, and literary activists of all kinds to discover and share ways to welcome more readers into their community. The National Book Foundation's third annual Why Reading Matters conference was held on June 7, 2018 at St. Francis College in Brooklyn, and included a full day of presentations focused on reading without boundaries.

Eat, Drink & Be Literary 
Started in 2006, Eat, Drink & Be Literary is the National Book Foundation's partnership with BAM to create an intimate evening of food and literary conversation. Each event begins with dinner, wine, and live music. Then the evening's featured author reads from his or her work and discusses the creative process. Guests are encouraged to ask questions and have their book signed at the conclusion of the evening.

Notes from the Reading Life 
Notes from the Reading Life is a discussion series featuring some of New York City's most well-known and well-read residents discussing the books that excite and inspire them—the books they grew up with and the ones that guided them through their careers, helping to make them into who they are today. Presented in partnership with the New York Public Library, Notes from the Reading Life takes place branches throughout the city, with each event featuring a special guest from fields such as culture, art, entertainment, or public service in conversation with an acclaimed author—celebrating the formative role of books in both of their lives. Audience members receive free copies of a book selected in partnership with the speakers and local librarians, and each branch produces special future programming around that book.

See also
 Innovations in Reading Prize
 National Book Award

References

Citations
 National Book Foundation. nationalbook.org. 
 National Book Foundation: Presenter of the National Book Awards. This home page retrieved 2014-12-06 carries the internal title "2014 National Book Award Winners".

External links
 

.
Arts organizations based in New York City
Non-profit organizations based in New York City
Arts organizations established in 1989
1989 establishments in the United States